Unified Tag Team Championship may refer to any of the following professional wrestling tag team championships:

Unified Tag Team Championship, the top tag team championships currently defended in All Pro Wrestling and Vendetta Pro Wrestling
Unified World Tag Team Championship (AJPW), the top tag team championship that is currently defended in All Japan Pro Wrestling
Unified WWE Tag Team Championship, the top tag team championship that was defended in World Wrestling Entertainment, now known as the WWE Raw Tag Team Championship